The Ministry of Natural Resources and Environment (Abrv: MNRE;) is a cabinet ministry in the Government of Thailand.

History 
The ministry was founded in 2002. Its responsibilities include the protection of the nation's natural resources: water, oceans, minerals, and forests. It is also responsible for the protection and restoration of the environment. It vision is "to return the natural environment to the Thai people and to work towards the incorporation of natural resources and the environment in the Government's national agenda as these provide the basis for social and economic development."

Departments

Administration
Office of the Minister
Office of the Permanent Secretary

Dependent departments
 Department of Mineral Resources
 Department of Marine and Coastal Resources
 Phuket Marine Biological Center
 Department of Water Resources
 Department of Groundwater Resources
 Royal Forest Department
 Department of National Parks, Wildlife and Plant Conservation
 Office of the Natural Resources and Environmental Policy and Planning (ONEP)
 Department of Environmental Quality Promotion
 Pollution Control Department

State enterprises
The Botanical Garden Organization of Thailand
Queen Sirikit Botanic Garden, Mae Rim, Chiang Mai
The Forest Industry Organization
The National Elephant Institute
Watchan Eco-Tourism
The Thai Plywood Company Limited
Wastewater Management Authority
Zoological Park Organization
Dusit Zoo (closed in 2018)
Khao Kheow Open Zoo
Chiang Mai Zoo
Chiang Mai Night Safari
Nakhon Ratchasima Zoo
Songkhla Zoo

Public organizations
 Thailand Greenhouse Gas Management Organization (TGO)
 Biodiversity-Based Economy Development Office

Environmental initiatives
 In August 2015, the MNRE announced a program to "encourage people to refrain from using plastic bags." The initiative is aimed at promoting the use of cloth bags one day a month beginning on 15 August and on the 15th day of every month thereafter. The campaign will be expanded to two to three days a week instead of once a month if public response is positive. Thailand could lower the use of plastic bags by as many as one million bags a day if everyone used one fewer plastic bag a day. The program was partially superseded by Thailand's ban on single-use plastic bags at major retail outlets as of 1 January 2020.
 MNRE's master plan is the 20-Year Strategic Plan for the Ministry of Natural Resources and Environment (B.E. 2560 – 2579) covering the years 2016–2016. It outlines six strategies to address environmental issues, including addressing climate change (Strategy Five).

Issues

Forests
The first strategy in MNRE's strategic plan is to "protect forest areas". The first line of forest defense are the roughly 20,000 forest rangers from three departments of MNRE: the Department of National Parks, Wildlife and Plant Conservation; the Royal Forest Department; and the Department of Marine and Coastal Resources. Their work is hazardous:  ten forest rangers were killed in the line of duty over the previous 12-month period. Despite the danger and the importance of their work, they are temporary workers on one or four year contracts. The one-year rangers earn from 7,500 to 9,000 baht per month. The four-year contract rangers can earn "...more than 10,000 baht salary per month." Temporary workers are not eligible for government health coverage.

Plastic waste
Thailand will move to ban the import of all plastic waste products. Initially MNRE will ban the import of 411 types of e-waste. The import of all plastic wastes will be banned in the next two years. "We need to prioritise good environment and the health of our citizens over industrial development," said Natural Resources and Environment Minister Surasak Kanchanarat. Some exceptions will be allowed: the new laws will allow the import of used electronic telecommunication products and copying machines for repair and reuse. Steel, copper, and aluminum scraps will be allowed for industrial if the scraps are clean and not mixed with other substances. Imports of electronic and plastic waste resulting in massive piles of scrap were turning the country into the "world's garbage bin".

See also
Cabinet of Thailand
Deforestation in Thailand
Environmental issues in Thailand
Government of Thailand
List of Government Ministers of Thailand
Office of the National Water Resources

References 

 
Natural Resources and Environment
Mining in Thailand
Thailand, Natural Resources and Environment
2002 establishments in Thailand
Thailand
Thailand
Thailand
Environmental agencies in Thailand